Martinique is a small Caribbean island which is an overseas department/region and single territorial collectivity of France. An integral part of the French Republic, Martinique is located in the Lesser Antilles of the West Indies in the eastern Caribbean Sea. One of the Windward Islands, it is directly north of Saint Lucia, northwest of Barbados and south of Dominica. Martinique is also an Outermost Region (OMR) of the European Union and a special territory of the European Union; the currency in use is the euro. Virtually the entire population speaks both French (the sole official language) and Martinican Creole.

Given its geography, the balance of its transport network is unusual: there are three airports, only 2.5 km of heritage railway, and 2,105 km of paved highways (in 2000).  Sea transport is also important, and there are two harbours at Fort-de-France and La Trinité.

Road transport 
As of 2000, Martinique had 2,105 km of paved highways.

There is a part of the N5 road that has been upgraded as a motorway, running from the capital Fort-de-France through Lamentin, Ducos and Rivière Salée until Les Coteaux.

Rail transport 

Martininique has now(2018) only one railway line in operation: The little-known 2.5 km long Le Train des Plantations is a heritage railway that runs from the Rhum Museum in Sainte-Marie through some sugarcane and banana plantations over two Bailey bridges to the Banana Museum.

In former times several narrow gauge sugarcane railways existed. Saint-Pierre had horse-drawn trams, which had an unusually narrow gauge. At least two steam locomotives are preserved in an optically refurbished condition, but not operational.

Air transport 
It has three airports, the main one being Martinique Aimé Césaire International Airport. See List of Airports in Martinique.

References

Transport in Martinique
Rail transport in Martinique